{{DISPLAYTITLE: 2-C-Methyl-D-erythritol-2,4-cyclopyrophosphate}}

2-C-Methyl--erythritol-2,4-cyclopyrophosphate (MEcPP) (also 2-C-Methyl--erythritol-2,4-cyclodiphosphate) is an intermediate in the MEP pathway (non-mevalonate) of isoprenoid precursor biosynthesis. MEcPP is produced by MEcPP synthase (IspF) and is a substrate for HMB-PP synthase (IspG).

Under conditions of oxidative stress, MEcPP accumulates in certain bacteria. MEcPP releases histone-like proteins from DNA, triggering nucleoid decondensation in Chlamydia trachomatis during the process of terminal differentiation. Abiotic stresses to plants, including wounding and excessive high-light exposure, lead to an increase in MEcPP accumulation in chloroplasts. Transported from the chloroplast to the plant cell nucleus, MEcPP engages in retrograde signalling that leads to the specific induction of nuclear-encoded stress-response genes.

References

Organophosphates